The Best of the Alan Parsons Project is a 1983 greatest hits compilation by the Alan Parsons Project. In addition, it contained a new song "You Don't Believe", which would be included on the next Project album, Ammonia Avenue. In 1986, it had become the first album of the group to be released in the Soviet Union, although the song "Psychobabble" was removed from it. No songs from Tales of Mystery and Imagination were included.

Track listing

Charts

Certifications

References

1983 greatest hits albums
The Alan Parsons Project albums
Arista Records compilation albums